Cella is a municipality in the province of Teruel, Aragon, Spain. In 2018 it had a population of 2,606 inhabitants.

References 

Municipalities in the Province of Teruel